Earl Coleman Francis (July 14, 1935 – July 3, 2002) was an American professional baseball player. A right-handed pitcher, he appeared in 103 games, 52 of them as a starter, in Major League Baseball between 1960 and 1965.

Francis signed with the Pittsburgh Pirates in 1954, and after one season in Class D, he did a four-year hitch in the United States Air Force before returning to the Pirates' system in 1959. He started  in Triple-A, then was recalled to Pittsburgh in June to begin a 2-year run in the big leagues.

Francis set personal bests in games pitched (36), games won (nine), earned run average (3.07) and complete games (five). He also threw his only MLB shutout, a three-hitter August 25 against the St. Louis Cardinals. Francis dropped that contest, 5–2. During the course of the year, he saw his ERA climb to 4.53 and was only 2–6 in starting roles. In , the Redbirds kept Francis in the minors except for two late-season appearances in relief. He toiled one more season at the Triple-A level in 1966 before leaving baseball.

In the majors, Francis won 16 of 39 decisions (.410) in 103 games and 405 innings pitched. He allowed 398 hits and 181 bases on balls, striking out 263. After retiring from the field, he lived and worked in Pittsburgh until his death at age 66.

References

External links

1935 births
2002 deaths
African-American baseball players
Baseball players from West Virginia
Burials at Homewood Cemetery
Clinton Pirates players
Columbus Jets players
Indianapolis Indians players
Jacksonville Suns players
Major League Baseball pitchers
People from Slab Fork, West Virginia
Pittsburgh Pirates players
St. Louis Cardinals players
Salt Lake City Bees players
Seattle Angels players
20th-century African-American sportspeople
21st-century African-American people